Mianabad (also Romanized as Mīānābād; also known as Mahīnābād, Mīān Ābeh, Mīānābeh, Mīnāvād, Minawad, and Muhinābād) is a village in Sarab Rural District, Giyan District, Nahavand County, Hamadan Province, Iran. At the 2006 census, its population was 2,139, in 497 families.

References 

Populated places in Nahavand County